The Old River Lea is the former natural channel of the River Lea below Lea Bridge, in the London Borough of Hackney. The Old River forms a large meander from the Middlesex Filter Beds Weir to rejoin the main channel of the River Lee Navigation below Old Ford Lock, just west of the 2012 Olympic stadium.

The natural channel is joined by the River Lee Flood Relief Channel, and Dagenham Brook and a number of subsidiary channels to form the semi-tidal Bow Back Rivers, discharging into Bow Creek.

The natural channel forms the boundary between the London Boroughs of Hackney and Waltham Forest; and forms the eastern boundary of Hackney Marshes, and historically the western boundary of Leyton Marshes.

See also
 List of rivers of England
 List of reservoirs and dams in the United Kingdom
 Locks and Weirs on the River Lee
 Lea Valley Walk
 Lower Lea Valley

Notes

External links

Rivers of London
Geography of the London Borough of Tower Hamlets
Geography of the London Borough of Newham
Geography of the London Borough of Hackney
River Lea
2OldRiverLea